The Mongolia national under-20 football team is a youth football team operated under the auspices of Mongolian Football Federation.

Results and fixtures

2022

competitions

Performance at the AFC U-20 Asian Cup 
  AFC U 20 2020 championship qualification cancelled
 AFC U-20 Asian Cup qualifcation: Did not qualify

Performance at the FIFA U-20 World Cup 
  FIFA U 20 world cup Did not qualify

References

External links
MFF Official website

u20
Asian national under-20 association football teams